Pensby High School is a co-educational secondary school in Pensby, on the Wirral Peninsula, Merseyside, England.

The school site was originally
split between a boys' school and girls' school which was federated, allowing joint staffing/teaching across the two schools whilst the pupils of each school (in years 7 to 11 but not the sixth form) remained separate. The two schools merged to form one mixed school beginning from the start of the September 2015 term.

Notable former pupils 
Phillip Blond, political philosopher, theologian and director of the ResPublica think tank
Graham Branch, a professional footballer with Tranmere Rovers 1991–1998, Burnley 1999–2007
Steve Cummings, racing cyclist who took silver with GB team in 2004 Athens Olympics
Mike Dean, FA premier league referee
Phil Morris MBE, a former British army soldier who was awarded the David Cameron award for services for cancer awareness and survivorship. Awarded an Order of the British Empire from Her Majesty the Queen in June 2021
Ian Woan, a professional footballer with Nottingham Forest 1990–2000

References

External links 
 Pensby High School
 GOV.UK information
 Ofsted reports

Secondary schools in the Metropolitan Borough of Wirral
Educational institutions established in 1950
1950 establishments in England
Community schools in the Metropolitan Borough of Wirral